Yolande or Yolanta may refer to:

Royalty and nobility
Yolande of Aragon (disambiguation), several people
Yolande de Montferrat (c.1274–1317), Byzantine Empress consort
Yolande de Courtenay (c.1200–1233), wife of Andrew II of Hungary
Yolande of Jerusalem or Isabella II of Jerusalem (1212–1228), queen of Jerusalem
Yolanda of Vianden (1231–1283), daughter of Count Henry I of Vianden, Luxembourg; prioress of Marienthal from 1258
Yolande de Dreux, Queen of Scotland (1263–1330)
Yolande, Duchess of Lorraine (1428–1483)
Yolande of Valois (1434–1478), Duchess of Savoy

Other people
Yolande E. Chan, Jamaican-Canadian information systems professor
Yolande Dalpé (born 1948), Canadian mycologist
Yolande Grisé (born 1944), Canadian historian and writer
Yolande Mabika (born 1987), Congolese-born Brazilian judoka

Fictional
Yolande (Greyhawk), an elven queen in the World of Greyhawk setting of Dungeons & Dragons
Yolande Perraudin, a school nurse in the French animated television series Code Lyoko
Yolande Trueman, a character in the British soap opera EastEnders

See also
Yolanda (disambiguation)